Foundation deposits are the archaeological remains of the ritual burial of materials under the foundations of buildings.

Ancient Egypt

In the case of Ancient Egypt, foundation deposits took the form of ritual mudbrick lined pits or holes dug at specific points under temples or tombs, which were filled with ceremonial objects, usually amulets, scarabs, food, or ritual miniature tools, and were supposed to prevent the building from falling into ruin.

See also
 Builders' rites
 Cornerstone
 Cyrus Cylinder

References

Archaeological terminology
Archaeological features
Rituals attending construction